This is a list of census-designated places in Delaware. The United States Census Bureau defines census-designated places as unincorporated communities lacking elected municipal officers and boundaries with legal status.

As of the 2020 census, Delaware has 22 census-designated places, up from 19 in the 2010 census.

Census-designated places

See also 
 List of counties in Delaware
 List of municipalities in Delaware

References 

Delaware
Census-designated places in Delaware